Natural Elements is a studio album by the world fusion band Shakti, released in 1977 on CBS Records.

Track listing
 "Mind Ecology" (John McLaughlin) – 5:48
 "Face to Face" (John McLaughlin / Lakshminarayana Shankar) – 5:58
 "Come On Baby Dance with Me" (Lakshminarayana Shankar) – 1:59
 "The Daffodil and the Eagle" (John McLaughlin / Lakshminarayana Shankar) – 7:03
 "Happiness Is Being Together" (John McLaughlin) – 4:29
 "Bridge of Sighs" (John McLaughlin / Lakshminarayana Shankar)	– 3:52
 "Get Down and Sruti" (John McLaughlin / Lakshminarayana Shankar) – 7:03
 "Peace of Mind" (John McLaughlin) – 3:21

Personnel
Musicians
 Zakir Hussain – bongos, dholak, percussion, tabla, timbales, triangle, vocals
 John McLaughlin – guitar, acoustic guitar, vocals
 Lakshminarayana Shankar – viola, violin, vocals
 Vikku Vinayakram – ghatam, kanjeera, percussion, vocals

Production
 John Alcorn – illustrations
 Paula Scher – design

References

1977 albums
Shakti (band) albums
CBS Records albums